Steeple Peak is a  summit located in Sublette County of  Wyoming, United States.

Geography 
The peak is situated 1.5 mile west of the Continental Divide in the remote Wind River Range. It is set in the Bridger Wilderness, on land managed by Bridger-Teton National Forest. It is on the ridge between Haystack Mountain 1.2 mile to the north, and parent East Temple Peak 0.37 mile to the south. Other neighbors include Schiestler Peak, 2.2 mile to the northwest, and Temple Peak 1.25 mile southwest. Access is via a half-day hike on the Big Sandy Trail. Precipitation runoff from the mountain drains into tributaries of the Big Sandy River, which in turn is a tributary of the Green River.

Climate 
According to the Köppen climate classification system, Steeple Peak is located in an alpine subarctic climate zone with long, cold, snowy winters, and cool to warm summers. Due to its altitude, it receives precipitation all year, as snow in winter, and as thunderstorms in summer.

Climbing 

Established climbing routes:

 South Ridge –  – 1961 – Yvon Chouinard, Art Gran, John Hudson
 North Ridge and Upper West Face – 1964 – Richard Ream, Gerry Holdsworth
 East Ridge – 1979 – Alan Bartlett, David Black, Rick Bradshaw
 West face Major dihedral –  – 1995 – Tim Wolfe, Chris Abbott, Susan Wolfe
 North Ridge (aka Great North Chimney) – (III 5.8)

Hazards

Encountering bears is a concern in the Wind River Range. There are other concerns as well, including bugs, wildfires, adverse snow conditions and nighttime cold temperatures.

Importantly, there have been notable incidents, including accidental deaths, due to falls from steep cliffs (a misstep could be fatal in this class 4/5 terrain) and due to falling rocks, over the years, including 1993, 2007 (involving an experienced NOLS leader), 2015 and 2018. A 54-year-old climber from Durango fell 400–800 feet to his death from Steeple Peak in 2017. Other incidents include a seriously injured backpacker being airlifted near Squaretop Mountain in 2005, and a fatal hiker incident (from an apparent accidental fall) in 2006 that involved state search and rescue. The U.S. Forest Service does not offer updated aggregated records on the official number of fatalities in the Wind River Range.

See also
 List of mountain peaks of Wyoming

References

External links 
 Steeple Peak rock climbing: Mountainproject.com
 Weather forecast: National Weather Service
 2017 fatality

Bridger–Teton National Forest
Mountains of Sublette County, Wyoming
Mountains of Wyoming
North American 3000 m summits